The Indiana Weekly Messenger was a newspaper published in Indiana, Pennsylvania from 1856 to 1946.

Originally named the Democratic Messenger, the paper was established in 1856 by Joseph M. Thompson, Silas M. Clark and John F. Young as a Democratic organ favoring the election of James Buchanan for president. In the spring of 1857, Clark Wilson of Clearfield County purchased the paper, and continued to conduct it in the interest of the same party until the summer of 1860, when he sold a half interest in the office to Samuel A. Smith.

Wilson being a Democrat and Smith a Republican, the paper dropped its political slant and became an independent sheet. Around this time, its title was altered to The Indiana Messenger. Smith and Wilson issued the paper until 1862, when J. Willis Westlake purchased the interest of Wilson. The new firm then announced that the paper in the future would espouse the cause of the Republican Party. In 1865 Westlake was succeeded by his partner's father, ex-sheriff Joseph R. Smith, the firm name becoming J. R. Smith & Son. Ownership of the paper remained with the Smith family at least into the 1920s.

The paper bore the title Indiana Weekly Messenger from 1874 until its discontinuance in 1946.

References

Defunct newspapers published in Pennsylvania
Indiana, Pennsylvania
Publications established in 1856
Publications disestablished in 1946
1856 establishments in Pennsylvania
1946 disestablishments in Pennsylvania